Apollonopolis or Apollinopolis may refer to any of several ancient cities in Egypt or Aethiopia, including:

Apollonopolis Magna, the "Great Apollonopolis", capital of its own nome, now Edfu, Egypt
Apollonopolis Parva, the "Lesser Apollonopolis", was applied to two different cities:
Apollonopolis Parva (Hypselis) in the Hypseliote nome
Apollonopolis Parva in the Coptite nome, now Qus
Apollonos Hydreium in the Thebaid was called Apollonopolis
Apollonopolis in eastern Aethiopia